Collombey-Muraz is a municipality in the district of Monthey in the canton of Valais in Switzerland. There was an oil refinery in the town.

History
Collombey is first mentioned in 1263 as de Columberio.  Muraz was mentioned in 1283 as de Mura.

But it was a little over 200 years ago that its geographical and political configuration as an autonomous commune was finally established. This came about when the castellany of Monthey was divided in 1787.

Ancient ruins unearthed at archaeological site of Châble-Croix have been dated to be between 6880 and 6330 BC, suggesting it is the oldest site in the Canton of Valais. From 1900 onward the extraction of granite from the glacial moraine on the Barmaz heights unearthed Neolithic cemeteries going back to around 3000 to 1800 BC. On a geographical note, the commune's prehistoric history is highlighted by the presence of erratic blocks. The Pierre à Dzo (300 m3), the Pierre à Muguet (1000 m3) and the Studer Block (500 m3) are situated on the lower eastern slopes of the Pointe du Bellevue.

Two key locations form part of Collombey-Muraz's recent history: The Château d’Arbignon, which since 1647 until the present day is home to the religious community of the Bernardines. And the Château De Lavallaz manor house which was once a feudal residence and is still lived in today.

Up until 1960 Collombey-Muraz was principally an agricultural commune.

One patrimonial specificity of the commune's villages is without doubt the wells. Because of such a high water table, many wells were dug in the villages situated on the valley floor; Collombey, Collombey-le-Grand and Illarsaz. These supplied water for the populations and their cattle. It has even been suggested that the first action a family would take when deciding to build a house was to dig a well (Cahier de l’Association du Vieux Collombey-Muraz). As many as 62 existed. Many have survived to this day but are now purely ornamental. In recognition of this special treasure the communal authorities named a street and a square in the centre of Collombey Rue des Puits and Place des Puits.

The traditional bakery

In the year 2000 the demolition of a house in Collombey-Le-Grand brought to light the existence of an old communal bread oven. The discovery gave birth to the idea of reconstituting a rustic oven. This was considered a way both of safeguarding and showcasing the surviving elements retrieved from the old oven and of instigating a project of general interest.  A foundation was created to achieve this and on 21 September 2002 the new construction was inaugurated. Ever since, four events take place every year, on:

The Palm Sunday weekend

Federal Day of Thanksgiving, Repentance and Prayer

The November patron Saint's day

The period of Avent

On all of these occasions the association's master baker, Henri Vanay bakes his delicious bread and other specialties in the reconstituted oven.

Key historical events of Collombey-Muraz

1216 The Arbignon family start construction on the Château d'Arbignon which will later become the Bernardines’ monastery.

1283 First mention of the Parish of Muraz, having split from the Collombey parish. Ancient foundations are found under the present day church in Muraz.

1630 Construction of the Château de Châtillon. It becomes the Fay de Lavallaz manor. The first foundations date from the beginning of the 14th century.

1643 The Bernardine religious community undertake reconstruction work on the Château d'Arbignon before it becomes their monastery.

1647 The Bernardine monastery is founded.

1723 Collombey-Muraz is officially separated from Monthey. Collombey Parish is re-established from the moment the village church is consecrated that year.

1787 The castellany of Monthey is divided. On 22 September the governor, Jean-Joseph Jost summons the council members and entitled persons from Troistorrents, Collombey and Muraz to appear before him on 2 October in relation to the dividing up of the municipal assets.

1798 Population census: Collombey 209 inhabitants, Collombey-le-Grand 70, Muraz 202, Illarsaz 53, Les Neyres 57 inhabitants.

1811 Fire of Collombey church.

1826 Construction of the rectory in Collombey.

1847 The gates to the bridge crossing the Rhone between Collombey and Saint-Triphon are closed. Fortifications are built along the Rhone banks, which are then guarded night and day.

1855 Reconstruction work begins on the chapel in Collombey-le-Grand dedicated to Our Lady of Seven Joys.

1859 The first ever locomotive transits the commune's territory on the Tonkin railway line.

1873 The new church in Collombey is inaugurated.

1876 La Collombeyrienne music society is founded.

1881 Charles de Lavallaz establishes the cigarette and cigar manufactures in Monthey.

1894 The bridge in Illarsaz is constructed by G. Schmiedt from Geneva.

1897 The Muraz-based La Villageoise music society is founded.

1898 The new church in Muraz (with the original bell tower dating from 1657) and the town hall in Collombey are inaugurated.

1906 The bridge spanning the Rhone between Collombey and Saint-Triphon is constructed – 72 metres long and weighing 170.3 tons.

1907 The tram line Aigle-Ollon-Monthey is opened.

1909 L'Avenir music society is founded in Collombey.

1941 A camp is established in Illarsaz for Poles. Later Russians and Germans are also interned there.

1946 The Tonkin railway line is electrified from Saint-Maurice to Collombey.

1970-1971 A school complex is constructed on the Route de Collombey-le-Grand.

1976 The road bridge over the Tonkin railway line at the Vionnaz SSB stop (entirely situated in the commune of Collombey-Muraz) is constructed.  The bridge spanning the Rhone on the same road is also built linking it to the motorway.

1976 The SATOM waste incineration plant is inaugurated.

1981 The president of the Confederation, Mr Kurt Fürgler visits the Bernadines’ convent in the Château d'Arbignon, Collombey.

1986 A new bridge spanning the Rhone between Collombey and Saint-Triphon is constructed downstream from the original one.

1988 The two-hundredth anniversary of the commune of Collombey-Muraz is celebrated.

Geography
Collombey-Muraz is one of nine communes in the district Monthey. The district sits in the Chablais region in Valais, and is located on the left bank of the Rhone where the valley opens out just downstream of the constriction at Saint-Maurice. The commune is formed of five villages; Collombey, Muraz, Collombey-le-Grand, Illarsaz and Les Neyres. Of this area,  or 37.6% is used for agricultural purposes, while  or 40.2% is forested. The commune is one of the biggest in the canton of Valais in terms of surface area.

Of the built up area, industrial buildings made up 3.3% of the total area while housing and buildings made up 5.2% and transportation infrastructure made up 2.9%.  Out of the forested land, 36.1% of the total land area is heavily forested and 2.2% is covered with orchards or small clusters of trees.  Of the agricultural land, 24.8% is used for growing crops and 1.9% is pastures and 10.3% is used for alpine pastures.  Of the water in the municipality, 0.5% is in lakes and 1.8% is in rivers and streams.  Of the unproductive areas, 4.0% is unproductive vegetation and 3.4% is too rocky for vegetation.

On the heights above the villages, seven alpine pastures stretch out along the border with France. They are the property of La Bourgeoise, a longstanding communal institution formed of local inhabitants and based on the communal law of 1866. This institution rents out the alpine pastures to farmers during the summer months.

At 2042 meters above sea level, La Pointe du Bellevue is the commune's highest point. It offers extraordinary views over Lake Léman (Lake Geneva) and the multi-summited mountain Les Dents-du-Midi. La Pointe du Bellevue lends its name to a popular running race that has taken place every year since 2013.

The municipality is located in the Monthey district, on the left bank of the Rhone river.  It consists of the villages of Collombey-le-Grand, Collombey-le-Petit, Muraz and Illarsaz.

Lac de Conche is located in the municipality.

The villages

Collombey

This is the biggest of the five villages in the commune. At the end of 2016 its population was nearly 4600. It has seen unprecedented development since the 1990s with the construction of shopping centres and new residential buildings and houses.

Muraz

Muraz is situated on the side of the alpine foothills and is bordered by two streams. It has suffered from the capricious nature of these two water courses over the years, with floods occasionally destroying crops and homes. The village today extends both sides of the cantonal road, up the hillside and down onto the valley floor. As with the other localities, Muraz has grown considerably and presently has a population of 2700 inhabitants.

Collombey-le-Grand

If Collombey-le-Grand was ever bigger and grander than Collombey then it predates the 12th century which is as far back as local historian Maurice Parvex has been able to trace its history. Today the village would indeed merit the qualification of being bigger if the vast industrial zone along its borders were taken into consideration. The first inhabitants settled around the chapel of Our Lady of Seven Joys. But the village has also seen strong growth in recent years and now extends further onto the valley floor. The population presently stands at around 500.

Illarsaz

Lying on the road between Vionnaz and Aigle, Illarsaz is the perfect example of a valley floor village. The land surrounding the village was formerly marshes but has been transformed for market gardening and arable farming. The population of around 700 predominately live in detached single-family houses.  Illarsaz has not escaped the kind of development the rest of the commune has seen. So much so in fact, that the village infant school was recently re-opened.

Les Neyres

On the hillside above Monthey, Les Neyres is the fifth and smallest village in the commune. Access is by the road to Val d’Illiez with a short but steep and winding climb off this, leading to the village of 400 inhabitants. The population of around 700 predominately live in detached single-family houses.

Coat of arms
The blazon of the municipal coat of arms is Azure Walls embattled and towered Argent masoned and doored Sable between three Doves volant of the second.  The doves and walls ( make this an example of canting.

Demographics

, 22.9% of the population are resident foreign nationals. Over the last 10 years (2000–2010 ) the population has changed at a rate of 30.1%. It has changed at a rate of 21.6% due to migration and at a rate of 7.5% due to births and deaths.

Most of the population speaks French (5,123 or 90.0%) as their first language, German is the second most common (144 or 2.5%) and Italian is the third (140 or 2.5%).  There are 3 people who speak Romansh.

, the population was 49.8% male and 50.2% female.  The population was made up of 2,613 Swiss men (37.4% of the population) and 872 (12.5%) non-Swiss men.  There were 2,763 Swiss women (39.5%) and 743 (10.6%) non-Swiss women.  Of the population in the municipality, 1,585 or about 27.8% were born in Collombey-Muraz and lived there in 2000.  There were 1,517 or 26.6% who were born in the same canton, while 1,383 or 24.3% were born somewhere else in Switzerland, and 1,068 or 18.8% were born outside of Switzerland.

, children and teenagers (0–19 years old) make up 28.8% of the population, while adults (20–64 years old) make up 62.8% and seniors (over 64 years old) make up 8.3%.

, there were 2,437 people who were single and never married in the municipality.  There were 2,782 married individuals, 209 widows or widowers and 267 individuals who are divorced.

, there were 2,117 private households in the municipality, and an average of 2.6 persons per household.  There were 522 households that consist of only one person and 191 households with five or more people.  , a total of 2,031 apartments (91.8% of the total) were permanently occupied, while 128 apartments (5.8%) were seasonally occupied and 54 apartments (2.4%) were empty.  , the construction rate of new housing units was 14.2 new units per 1000 residents.  The vacancy rate for the municipality, was 2%.

The historical population is given in the following chart:

Politics
The municipal council is the executive authority of the commune. Since 1 January 2013, the number of council members decreased from nine to seven. Municipal elections take place every four years. Each counselor heads up an administrative department (dicastery). These function through committees made up of citizens from the commune and/or delegacies composed of municipal counselors. Both the committees and delegacies are presided by the counselor responsible for that dicastery.

Since 2013 the commune has a Conseil général, a general council, which acts as the body of legislative authority. 45 representatives were elected for the first time on 11 November 2012. Elections for the general council also take place every four years. Mr Yannick Butter has been the president of the commune since 2013.

In the 2007 federal election the most popular party was the CVP which received 38.08% of the vote.  The next three most popular parties were the SVP (21.86%), the SP (16.26%) and the FDP (15.14%).  In the federal election, a total of 1,858 votes were cast, and the voter turnout was 47.9%.

In the 2009 Conseil d'État/Staatsrat election a total of 1,370 votes were cast, of which 126 or about 9.2% were invalid.  The voter participation was 34.7%, which is much less than the cantonal average of 54.67%.  In the 2007 Swiss Council of States election a total of 1,805 votes were cast, of which 169 or about 9.4% were invalid.  The voter participation was 47.1%, which is much less than the cantonal average of 59.88%.

Presidents (1912–present)

2013–present Yannick Buttet (2 periods)

2006-2012 Granger Josiane (1.5 periods)

2001-2006 Métrailler Laurent (1.5 periods)

1985-2000  Lattion Antoine (4 periods)

1977-1984  Zimmermann Arthur

1967-1977  Berrut Jacques (2.5 periods)

1956-1967  Chervaz Sylvain (3 periods)

1933-1955  De Lavallaz Bernard (6 periods)

1921-1932  Parvex Maurice (3 periods)

1916-1919  Riondet Hubert

1912-1915  Burdevet Hubert

Economy

Over the past 30 years, many companies have chosen to establish themselves in Collombey-Muraz. , Collombey-Muraz had an unemployment rate of 4.7%.  , there were 110 people employed in the primary economic sector and about 27 businesses involved in this sector.  1,128 people were employed in the secondary sector and there were 107 businesses in this sector.  1,342 people were employed in the tertiary sector, with 210 businesses in this sector.  There were 2,892 residents of the municipality who were employed in some capacity, of which females made up 39.2% of the workforce.

 the total number of full-time equivalent jobs was 2,219.  The number of jobs in the primary sector was 92, of which 66 were in agriculture and 26 were in forestry or lumber production.  The number of jobs in the secondary sector was 1,061 of which 488 or (46.0%) were in manufacturing and 548 (51.6%) were in construction.  The number of jobs in the tertiary sector was 1,066.  In the tertiary sector; 544 or 51.0% were in wholesale or retail sales or the repair of motor vehicles, 48 or 4.5% were in the movement and storage of goods, 99 or 9.3% were in a hotel or restaurant, 11 or 1.0% were in the information industry, 12 or 1.1% were the insurance or financial industry, 69 or 6.5% were technical professionals or scientists, 70 or 6.6% were in education and 111 or 10.4% were in health care. In 2015, the Tamoil oil refinery supplied form the Rhône Pipeline ceased operations, putting some 250 employees out of work.

, there were 991 workers who commuted into the municipality and 2,114 workers who commuted away.  The municipality is a net exporter of workers, with about 2.1 workers leaving the municipality for every one entering.  About 3.1% of the workforce coming into Collombey-Muraz are coming from outside Switzerland, while 0.0% of the locals commute out of Switzerland for work.  Of the working population, 9% used public transportation to get to work, and 74.6% used a private car.

Agriculture and the environment

The major landscape and drainage works carried out on the valley floor during the Second World War made it possible to intensify crops and modernize the means of production.

Environmental protection and land use planning are ongoing concerns to the authorities. The first development plan with its specific regulations dates back to 1964 and the public facilities related to environment issues are in constant realization.

Religion
Of the rest of the population, there were 26 members of an Orthodox church (or about 0.46% of the population), there were 8 individuals (or about 0.14% of the population) who belonged to the Christian Catholic Church, and there were 147 individuals (or about 2.58% of the population) who belonged to another Christian church. There were 6 individuals (or about 0.11% of the population) who were Jewish, and 148 (or about 2.60% of the population) who were Islamic. There were 11 individuals who were Buddhist, 3 individuals who were Hindu and 5 individuals who belonged to another church.  362 (or about 6.36% of the population) belonged to no church, are agnostic or atheist, and 240 individuals (or about 4.21% of the population) did not answer the question.

Culture
The municipality benefits from its proximity to Monthey with its rich and diverse cultural life. Within the commune, the musical groups Les Colombes and le Chœur mixte form the pillars of the culture backbone. An amateur theater group the Théâtre du Rovra offers the local public annual shows, something it has managed to do since 1946.

The socio-cultural faculties have developed greatly in recent years. Le Centre des Perraires is at the heart of this with a sports center with multipurpose rooms, swimming pool, primary schools, secondary school, a municipal library, three football fields, tennis courts, a network of walking and hiking trails, playgrounds, and a covered 200 seated-area to host events for clubs and families. The commune hosts its Swiss day celebrations on 1 August every year at Le Centre des Perraires.

In sporting and cultural terms, 23 local clubs and societies allow for nearly 2,400 people to indulge in their favorites pastimes.

Sports

Football

The Collombey-Muraz Sporting Union (L'Union sportive Collombey-Muraz, USCM) was founded in 1970 as a result of the merger of FC Collombey and FC Muraz. In 2014 the club counted about 220 members distributed across fourteen teams, including a team playing in each the 2nd and 3rd regional leagues, one in senior league and 11 in junior leagues. The USCM also offers its youth a football academy that brings together 20 to 25 children per season.

Basketball

The BBC Collombey-Muraz, created in 1982, is one of the many clubs active in Collombey-Muraz. It has an average of one hundred members. The club's principal goal stems from its statutes: to encourage the development of basketball and its practice, especially for the youth. The current committee is focusing on this last point and concentrating its efforts on the grouping of young people, in collaboration with the Chablais Valais (Monthey, Troistorrents) and Vaud (Aigle) clubs. The 1st team, present in the Swiss league championship since 1992 without interruption, sees itself as an ideal first step for a young person in their basketball career. Each season, young people from Chablais basketball come to join the team. For many years the club has been collaborating with the BBC Monthey as part of a partnership signed between the two clubs under the aegis of the National Basketball League. For more than 20 years, the club has been proud of having never paid a single player, playing in the 1st national league. The members come together simply because of their passion for the sport. The club strives to keep a family identity where everyone can find their place. It also offers adults, young and old, the opportunity to practice basketball in the 2nd cantonal league. Finally, the many youth teams (M19, M16, M14, M12, M10 and M8) crisscross Switzerland through their participation in the cantonal, Romands (COBB) and Swiss championships.

Judo

The Collombey-Muraz judo school (l’école de judo de Collombey-Muraz, EJCM) was founded in November 1977. Since that time members of the EJCM have won more than 200 competitions in the Valais and Swiss championships. The EJCM counts many black belts in its membership.

Table tennis

The Collombey-Muraz table tennis club (Le club de tennis de table de Collombey-Muraz, (CTTCM) was founded in June 1974 and remains the principal table tennis club in the Chablais. CTTCM has played for over 40 years in the AVVF association of table tennis which groups the clubs of the cantons of Vaud, Valais and Friborg. At its foundation, the club had about ten members and played in the 4th league. It lost its first ever match to the Vouvry club (which has since disbanded). And yet from these humble beginnings the 1st team now evolves in the national "C" league.  The 2nd team plays in league one with the other four teams, formed of young and not so young, fight it out in the 3rd, 4th and 5th leagues. The committee in place puts a special emphasis on the table tennis academy (from 8 years) preparing what it hopes will be future champions or members of the club of tomorrow. This strategy is designed to ensure that the club retains its place as an active member of communal societies, hopefully even increasing its current level of activity. The club currently has 50 members (25 adults, 25 young people). CTT Collombey-Muraz is very active in its association with the AVVF. On the cantonal level, it organized the Valais championships in 1977/1986/1994/2000/2004/2012/2014 and 2017. This last event took place the Corbier school gym from 4–5 February 2017. At the Swiss Romande level, CCTTCM organizes final matches, promotion and ranking tournaments. And on a national level, it organizes pools for promotion from league B to national league A, and the Swiss cup finals. In 2009, CTTCM organized an international match between Switzerland and Greece. The match took place in a packed house (more than 350 people); it was a great success and a showcase for table tennis.

website: www.cttcollombey-muraz.ch

Running race

The first edition of The "Bellevue Trail" took place on 29 June 2013. It offers two routes of 10 and 32 km respectively, as well as a children's course.

Archery Club

The Arc-Club Collombey-Muraz brings together archers from all over Valais and the Chablais-vaudois. The association has been  based in the commune since 1973. It is affiliated to the national federation SwissArchery and supported by Jeunesse + Sport. The archery club is active in competitive sport (on target as well as in the forest) and as a leisure activity. Many members have already distinguished themselves at the national level, and some even at the European level. It is open to Olympic arches (classical), compound arches, bare-bows, and more traditional arches (bowhunters and longbows). In summer, training takes place at the Bochet field and in the winter at the gym behind the Muraz church. Beginner classes are open to young people from the age of ten, as well as adults of all ages.

Badminton

The Badminton Club Collombey-Muraz was established in the summer of 2003.

Wrestling Club

The wrestling club of Illarsaz-Haut-Lac celebrated its 70th anniversary in 2012. Founded in 1942 by a group of wrestling friends from the region, training began outdoors. Despite the very basic means available to the club, very quickly a small group of about ten members was formed. Today, the wrestling club of Illarsaz-Haut-Lac trains more than 30 young people from the age of five. Indeed, the club has known in the past great moments of glory with many very good results in both Swiss wrestling and freestyle wrestling. These include many medals at the Swiss Free and Greco-Roman Wrestling Championships as well as several participations in various international championships. Our fighters have also been active in Swiss wrestling with many laurels and even a Federal crown for Alain Bifrare in 1986 in Sion. In recent years, the committee decided to revitalize the club - after seeing the numbers decline - with the arrival of new sports with a more "fun" element. The club put all its energy into promoting training and wrestling fixtures of young wrestlers. Wrestling requires many qualities such as agility, flexibility, coordination, intelligence, strength and fair play, which makes this sport one of the most complete packages. Our goal is to promote wrestling, in a fun and pleasant way while respecting the rules dictated by the "Youth and Sport" organisation. For the most motivated and eager, the club offers them the opportunity to participate in tournaments throughout the year. In recent years, the club has tried to organize a maximum amount of competitions within the municipality. In 2009, it hosted the Swiss Free Wrestling Championship with Florian Vieux finishing 3rd. In 2011 the championship Romand took place in the commune and during the summer of 2012, the Valaisan Cantonal Feast of Wrestling Switzerland took place at Les Perraires where Sylvain Vieux was crowned champion.

Ski-Club Bellevue

On 11 December 1968, a team of friends met to form the SC Bellevue of Collombey-Muraz. Since then, the SC organizes every winter, ski-mountaineering, alpine skiing and hiking outings to. The handful of friends at the beginning has grown into a large active group. Indeed, today the SC has many members.

Since 1979, the members meet at the Chalet de Conches, a former alpine chalet now rented to the SC by the Bourgeoisie of Collombey-Muraz.

The flagship event, remains the traditional all-public competition, open to all members of the SC as well as to all the residents of the territory of the commune, it comprises:

   a giant slalom (route: customs of Culet - Chalet Neuf);

   a skinning race (route: Chalet-Neuf - Pointe de Bellevue).

Tennis club

The Collombey-Muraz Tennis Club (le tennis club de Collombey-Muraz, TCMC) founded in 1984, is one of the commune's largest sports clubs. Its competition groups include, five interclub teams including two men's (active and young seniors) in the 2nd League, two men's (young seniors) in the 3rd League and one women's (young senior ladies) in the 1st League groups.  The TCMC has more than a hundred Swisstennis licensees. In August each year, the club organizes a Grand Open tournament overseen by Swisstennis.

Châble-Croix Shooting club

In 2008, the Tir Sportive Châble-Croix sports shooting club came in to being through the merger of the Les Carabiniers de Collombey-Muraz, L'Avenir de Vionnaz and Le Petit Caliber de Châble-Croix . In 2014, the culb won the title of Swiss champion in the LNB section competition, and many of its representatives are known at both cantonal and national levels.

Combat sports

The commune of Collombey-Muraz has a Tai-jitsu club since 2008, a karate club and a martial arts school.

Acrobatic Rock / RCC Tequila Rock

The Tequila Rock club was founded in Collombey-Muraz in 1994. It participates in events such as weddings, demonstrations, entertainment evenings and competitions, etc.

Women's Gymnastics Society

Since its founding in 1957, the Companie Feminine de Gymnastique (SFG) "The doves" (les Colombes) of Collombey-Muraz has continued to develop gymnastics in the municipality. With 319 members from 2 to 78 years old and 41 instructors (as of June 2016), the SFG offers some 25 hours a week of gymnastics: Parents-Children gym, children's gym, Youth A and B (from 6 to 16 years), Juniors, Bodyfit, Ladies 35 + / 55 +, not to mention the specialized groups "Apparel Gymnastics", "Athletics" and a "Power Yoga" class.

Education
Collombey-Muraz offers to the children of the commune nursery and primary schools, as well as a secondary school on the site of Les Perraires in Collombey. In view of the municipality's demographic expansion, a new school in the village of Muraz opened its doors for the start of 2014-15 school year.

The Commune is also home to a communal day nursery Les Menoits and an out-of-school-hours activities/care center for pupils up to the age of 11, Le Coup de Pouce.

In Collombey-Muraz about 2,064 or (36.2%) of the population have completed non-mandatory upper secondary education, and 503 or (8.8%) have completed additional higher education (either university or a Fachhochschule).  Of the 503 who completed tertiary schooling, 53.3% were Swiss men, 27.6% were Swiss women, 11.5% were non-Swiss men and 7.6% were non-Swiss women.

, there were 22 students in Collombey-Muraz who came from another municipality, while 214 residents attended schools outside the municipality.

Collombey-Muraz is home to the Bibliothèque communale library.  The library has 13,019 books or other media, and loaned out 34,135 items in the same year.  It was open a total of 121 days with average of 14 hours per week during that year.

Transports 
The village of Collombey is served by two railway lines, the CFF Tonkin line (Saint-Maurice–Saint-Gingolph) and the regional tram, the AOMC (Aigle–Ollon–Monthey–Champéry). Transports Publics du Chablais (TPC) offers a vast bus service connecting the commune's five villages and the wider Chablais with services to Monthey, Vionnaz, Vouvry, Aigle, Bex etc.

Junction 18 (St-Triphon, Pas-de-Morgins) of the A9 motorway is two kilometres from the centre of Collombey.

Notable People
Gilbert Constantin, painter and sculptor (1947-2010).

References

External links

 Official website 
 

Municipalities of Valais